Sankt-Peterburgsky Uyezd (Санкт-Петербургский уезд) was one of the subdivisions of the Saint Petersburg Governorate of the Russian Empire. It was situated in the northern part of the governorate. Its administrative centre was Saint Petersburg.

Demographics
At the time of the Russian Empire Census of 1897, Sankt-Peterburgsky Uyezd had a population of 1,317,885. Of these, 85.4% spoke Russian, 4.0% German, 2.9% Finnish, 2.8% Polish, 1.0% Estonian, 0.9% Yiddish, 0.5% Latvian, 0.4% Ukrainian, 0.4% Tatar, 0.4% Swedish, 0.3% Lithuanian, 0.3% French, 0.2% Belarusian, 0.2% English, 0.1% Armenian and 0.1% Karelian as their native language.

References

 
Uezds of Saint Petersburg Governorate
Saint Petersburg Governorate
History of Saint Petersburg
History of Leningrad Oblast